Asquith Bluff is a prominent wedge-shaped rock bluff on the west side of Lennox-King Glacier,  southeast of Mount Allen Young. It was discovered by the British Antarctic Expedition (1907–09) and named Mount Asquith for H. H. Asquith, Prime Minister of the United Kingdom, 1908–16, who was instrumental in securing a grant from the United Kingdom Government to pay off the expedition's debts.

See also
Vertigo Bluff

References
 

Cliffs of the Ross Dependency
Shackleton Coast